Alfred Newbold (7 August 1921 – January 2002) is a former professional footballer, who played for Huddersfield Town, Newport County and Worcester City.

References

Further reading

1921 births
2002 deaths
English footballers
Footballers from Hartlepool
Association football defenders
English Football League players
Huddersfield Town A.F.C. players
Newport County A.F.C. players
Worcester City F.C. players